Rocketcrash is the first material released by The Mushroom River Band.  It was recorded and released in 500 copies under the band's own label, Tea Pot Records in 1999.

Track listing
"Twin Lyrics #1"
"Super Insomnia"
"B.M."
"Loser's Blues"

The Mushroom River Band albums
1999 EPs